Future West is a centre-left political ticket which contests the local elections in West Auckland, New Zealand.

It was formed in 2010 by former Waitakere city councillor Greg Presland and with the intention of "keeping community assets like libraries, pools and water in community control" and ensuring "safer streets, local jobs, better public transport and to see the Eco-City values spread across the region".

In 2016, the Future West ticket won all six seats on the Waitākere Ranges Local Board, two seats on the Portage Licensing Trust and one seat on Waitakere licensing trust. Greg Presland was elected the chair of the local board. In 2018, board member Denise Yates, also a former Waitakere City councillor, died at the age of 77. A by-election was scheduled and Future West selected Tiaria Fletcher to stand. Fletcher lost the election, coming third place with 1,625 votes (19.01% of total votes cast). The vacancy was filled by Ken Turner of the more conservative WestWards ticket.

References

Politics of the Auckland Region